The Awami National Party (ANP; , ; lit. People's National Party) is a Pashtun nationalist, secular and leftist political party in Pakistan. The party was founded by Abdul Wali Khan in 1986 and its current president is Asfandyar Wali Khan, grandson of Bacha Khan, with Mian Iftikhar Hussain serving as the Secretary-General. Part of the PPP-led cabinet of the Pakistani government during 2008−13, ANP's political position is considered left-wing, advocating for secularism, public sector government, and social egalitarianism.

ANP was the largest Pashtun nationalist party in Pakistan between 2008−2013 with influence lying in the Pashtun dominated areas in and around Khyber-Pakhtunkhwa. They governed the province from 2008–2013 but lost to Pakistan Tehreek-e-Insaf in the assembly election of 2013.

History
Abdul Wali Khan's political career had been built on the tradition of intense Pashtun nationalism inherited from his father, Abdul Ghaffar Khan (Bacha Khan). Although it was formed after the partition of India, most of its leaders had favoured a united India, and had opposed the partition of India and the creation of Pakistan. Most of the leaders were Indian National Congress right hands before the partition of India. Both men were opposed to the creation of Pakistan, and after the creation of Pakistan in 1947, they were imprisoned. In 1956 Wali Khan joined the National Awami Party (NAP), led by a charismatic Bengali socialist, Abdul Hamid Khan Bhashani. In 1965 the NAP split into two factions, with Wali Khan becoming president of the pro-Moscow faction. The party's members participated in 1970 parliamentary elections through the Pakistan Peoples Party's platform and the National Awami Party, forming a largest socialist alliance with Zulfikar Ali Bhutto in 1970. However, the alliance fell apart and its members joined the Pakistan National Alliance.

In 1972 the party was strong enough to form coalition provincial governments, with its partner the Jamiat Ulema-e-Islam (JUI) in Khyber Pakhtunkhwa and Balochistan. These governments were short lived. Wali Khan was again jailed, and his party was barred from politics when the Supreme Court upheld the finding of President Bhutto that the NAP was conspiring against the state of Pakistan. General Zia-ul-Haq subsequently withdrew the charges against the NAP. Wali Khan was released, joined the National Democratic Party, and ultimately formed the Awami National Party. In the meantime, Prime Minister Bhutto was imprisoned and executed in April 1979.

Formation and struggle for democracy

The Awami National Party (awami means "people's"), which depends on ethnic Pashtuns (Pukhtuns) of Khyber Pakhtunkhwa (formerly NWFP) and northern Balochistan as its political base, was formed in 1986 by the merger of several left-leaning parties including the Awami Tehrik and the National Democratic Party.

The National Democratic Party merged with several other progressive political and nationalist groups to form the Awami National Party. Wali Khan, the influential Pashtun and Soviet-backed leader, was elected as its first president and Sindhi socialist Rasul Bux Palejo was appointed its first secretary general. From 1986 to 1988, the ANP party was a member of the Movement for Restoration of Democracy.

Alliance with Pakistan Peoples Party (PPP)
Since its inception, the ANP has been an important ally of the Pakistan Peoples Party (PPP). The party formed a coalition government with the PPP in Khyber-Pakhtunkhwa, and in Sindh province and Islamabad for central government after the Pakistani parliamentary elections in 1988. This alliance, however, collapsed in April 1989 after differences cropped up between the two parties, after Prime Minister Benazir Bhutto ordered a military action that brutally failed. The Awami National Party later formed an alliance with the Pakistan Muslim League (PML) in early June 1989 which led to a formal split in the party with many activists allying with the PPP.

After the election of Nawaz Sharif in 1990, the ANP again formed a coalition with former rivals PML. This alliance proved longer lasting, surviving till 1998 when it collapsed over differences over the building of Kalabagh Dam and renaming the province NWFP to Pakhtunkhwa. It won six seats in the National Assembly in the 1990 elections. In the 1993 national elections, the party won three seats in the National Assembly. It then joined the Grand Democratic Alliance, campaigning against the Sharif government's policies. After Nawaz Sharif's overthrow by Pervez Musharraf, the party stayed an active member of the Alliance for Restoration of Democracy, until the 2001 September 11 attacks in the United States, when it left the alliance over supporting NATO's ouster of the Taliban government. The party's reputation was damaged in this period following the arrest of former Federal Minister and senior party leader Azam Khan Hoti.

In the 2002 elections the party struck up an alliance with the PPP. However, both parties were electorally routed in Khyber Pakhtunkhwa by the religion-political alliance Muttahida Majlis-e-Amal (MMA) riding on a wave of anti-American sentiment in Pakistan.

In the 2008 parliamentary elections, the ANP dominated the far-right wing coalition, the MMA, a party formed by coalition of Islamic movements in 2002. The ANP has also won provincial seats in Balochistan and in Sindh for the first time in 15 years. It formed a coalition government with the Pakistan People's Party in all three provinces. In Khyber Pakhtunkhwa, the ANP has its first chief minister since 1948.

The strongholds of the ANP are in the Pashtun dominated areas of Pakistan, particularly in the Valley of Peshawar area in Khyber Pakhtunkhwa and it has traditionally dominated Charsadda, Mardan, Nowshera, Peshawar, and Swabi areas of central KPK. On the other hand, the city of Karachi in Sindh province hosts one of the largest Pashtun populations in the world, but the ANP only had 2 seats in 2011, whereas the number of Pashtuns present would predict them having "up to 25 seats".

Recent events

In May 2008, Asfandyar Wali Khan made an unannounced visit to the United States in which he and his delegate held high-level meetings with top U.S. officials. A source explained that "the delegation is here as part of a visitors programme that brings important people from other nations for meeting US civil and military officials and members of the civic society." This was Wali Khan's second such visit to the United States, a country where he has several relatives.

In the last decade, hundreds of members of the ANP have been assassinated or became victims of target killings. Most of the attacks occurred in the Karachi and Peshawar areas. An ANP rally in Quetta was subject to a bomb blast on 13 July 2012. The blast killed six people and injured 12 others. It was speculated that a cycle parked behind the stage was the probable cause. The dead included two children as well.

The party has also accused Pakistan Tehreek-e-Insaf chairman Imran Khan and of being complicit in the Taliban attacks.

On 10 July 2018, during the 2018 Pakistani general election there was a suicide bombing attack on political rally of Awami National Party (ANP) in YakaToot neighborhood of Peshawar in which fourteen people were killed and sixty-five injured. Among the killed was ANP's Khyber Pakhtunkhwa Assembly candidate, Haroon Bilour. Bilour was son of Bashir Ahmad Bilour who was also killed in a suicide bombing attack in December 2012. Elections for Constituency PK-78 were postponed to an disclosed date by the Election Commission.

Ideology
The party espouses a nonviolent approach to tackling extremism. It promotes democratic socialism, secularism, economic egalitarianism, and Pashtun nationalism. The party has dense support among the Pashtun population in the country. Since 2000, its liberal socialism and pro-Pashtun philosophy has become the integral part of the party, advocating for the regional autonomy and increased Pashtun cultural expression. A frequent coalition partner in provincial politics, it was routed in the 2002 elections because of its opposition to the Taliban and support for the NATO-backed Karzai administration in neighboring Afghanistan.

It joined the opposition All Parties Democratic Movement, and along with other parties except the Pakistan Peoples Party resigned from Parliament in October 2007 in protest against the military regime of Pervez Musharraf. It was targeted in 2007 and 2008 by presumed supporters of the Taliban. Despite the attacks, the party has advocated dialogue with moderate tribal elements to end the violence in the Government of Khyber Pakhtunkhwa and Federally Administered Tribal Areas.

ANP leaders 
The Awami National Party is one of the few parties in Pakistan to hold a system of regular internal general elections every four-year period.

Presidents
1986−1990 Abdul Wali Khan
1991−1999 Ajmal Khattak
1999−2002 Asfandyar Wali Khan
2002−2003 Ehsan Wyne
2003−present Asfandyar Wali Khan
Others
Afzal Khan Lala
Ghulam Ahmad Bilour
Shahi Sayed, Provincial President ANP Sindh
Bashir Ahmad Bilour
Ameer Haider Khan Hoti
Baz Muhammad Khan
Malik Sirtaj Khan
Haji Muhammad Adeel
Qazi Anwar
Mian Iftikhar Hussain
Zahid Khan
Aimal Wali Khan

See also 
 List of political parties in Pakistan
 Kalabagh Dam
 Khan Abdul Jabbar Khan
 Bahram Khan family

References

External links
Awami National Party Official Site

 
Federalism in Pakistan
Secularism in Pakistan
Socialism in Pakistan
Democratic socialist parties in Asia
Pashtun nationalism
Pashtun politics